Darius Škarnulis (born October 21, 1977 in Alytus) is a Lithuanian race walker. Škarnulis represented Lithuania at the 2008 Summer Olympics in Beijing, and competed in the men's 50 km race walk, along with his teammate and twin brother Donatas. While his twin brother did not finish the walk, Darius received a final warning (a total of three red cards) for not following the proper form during the 10 km lap, and was subsequently disqualified.

References

External links

NBC Olympics Profile

Lithuanian male racewalkers
Living people
Olympic athletes of Lithuania
Athletes (track and field) at the 2008 Summer Olympics
Sportspeople from Alytus
1977 births